The Misadventures of Romesh Ranganathan is a BBC Two comedy travel documentary presented by Romesh Ranganathan. In 2020, it won a British Academy Television Award for Best Features.

Episodes

Series 1
Haiti
Ethiopia
Albania
Christmas (Canadian Arctic with Johnny Issaluk)

Series 2
Zimbabwe
Mongolia
Bosnia and Herzegovina
Colombia
Christmas - The Sahara

Series 3
Sierra Leone
Romania

From my sofa
Zimbabwe, Bosnia and the Sahara
Albania, Mongolia and the Arctic
Colombia, Haiti and Ethiopia
Christmas - The Hebrides

See also
Asian Provocateur

References

External links

Series 1 homepage
Series 2 homepage
From my sofa homepage

BBC travel television series
2010s British comedy television series
2010s British reality television series
2020s British comedy television series
2020s British reality television series
2018 British television series debuts
English-language television shows
Television shows set in Canada
Television shows set in Colombia
Television shows set in Mongolia
Television shows set in Scotland
Television shows set in Sussex